The Robinson-Smith House was built in 1909.  It was listed on the National Register of Historic Places in 2016.  It is American Foursquare in style. It was built by Glenn Charles McAlister (1873-1961), who was a self-trained architect.

References

		
National Register of Historic Places in Sheridan County, Wyoming
American Foursquare architecture in Wyoming
Houses completed in 1909